Mahdi Pirjahan (born 23 September 1999 in Tabriz) is an Iranian athlete specialising in the 400 metres hurdles. He represented his country at the 2019 World Championships narrowly missing the semifinals.

His personal best in the event is 49.33 seconds set in Lucknow in 2019. This is the current national record.

Tokyo 2020 Summer Olympic Games 
Pirjahan became the fourth Iranian athlete to win a quota place in Tokyo 2020 Olympics. He was supposed to participate at the Men's 400m hurdles but has tested positive for the coronavirus.

International competitions

References 

1999 births
Living people
Iranian male hurdlers
World Athletics Championships athletes for Iran
20th-century Iranian people
21st-century Iranian people
Islamic Solidarity Games competitors for Iran